The Supreme Court of Newfoundland and Labrador is the superior court for the Canadian province of Newfoundland and Labrador.  The Supreme Court has jurisdiction to hear appeals in both criminal and civil matters from the Provincial Court and designated boards and administrative tribunals. The court also hear serious criminal cases in the first instances, matters of probate, and family law matters.

The Supreme Court consists of 28 judicial seats including the position of Chief Justice. Of the current justices, 8 sit with supernumerary status.

About the Court

The Court is composed of the General Division and Family Division, and has the authority to hear a wide range of cases including civil and criminal matters, matters of estates and guardianship, and family matters. The Court has the authority to hear appeals of specific matters not under jurisdiction of the province's appellate court.

The Court is located in six regions of the province: Corner Brook (3 justices), Gander (1 justice), Grand Bank (1 justice), Grand Falls-Windsor (1 justice), Happy Valley-Goose Bay (1 justice), and St. John's (21 justices).

Current justices

Supernumerary

See also
 Judicial appointments in Canada
 Provincial Court of Newfoundland and Labrador
 Court of Appeal of Newfoundland and Labrador

References

External links
 Supreme Court of Newfoundland and Labrador

Newfoundland and Labrador courts
Newfoundland_and_Labrador
Buildings and structures in St. John's, Newfoundland and Labrador
1730 establishments in North America
Courts and tribunals established in 1730